Moli mala is the first album of the Croatian band Thompson. It was released in 1992. Danijela Martinović sang on the album as a guest for Potonut ću. Zdenko Runjić composed the song Grkinja. Thompson performed the album's eponymous track at the Skalinada festival in Split.

Track listing
 "Zmija me za srce ugrizla" (A snake bit my heart) (writing: Ž. Dundić, K. Crnogorac) (3:09)
 "Grkinja" (Greek woman) (writing: Z. Runjić) (2:54)
 "Potonut ću" (I'll Drown) (writing: T. Huljić, V. Huljić) (4:02)
 "Naša prva noć" (Our first night) (writing: M. Perković) (4:05)
 "Anđelina" (Angelina) (writing: M. Perković) (3:30)
 "Na ples" (At the dance) (writing: M. Perković) (3:39)
 "Moli mala" (Pray, babe) (writing: M. Perković) (5:07)
 "Jer, Hrvati smo" (Because we are Croats) (writing: M. Perković) (4:07)
 "Bojna - Čavoglave [remix]" (Čavoglave bataillon) (writing: M. Perković) (3:37)
 "Varala se mala" (She was wrong) (writing: M. Perković) (3:48)
 "Ela" (writing: M. Perković) (3:28)
 "Smišnica" (writing: M. Perković) (3:07)
 "Budi uz mene" (Stand by me) (writing: M. Perković) (3:31)
 "Ja ću poći ove noći" (I will leave tonight) (writing: M. Perković) (4:59)

References

1992 albums
Thompson (band) albums